"Nowhere Bound" is a song written by Monty Powell and Jule Medders, and recorded by American country music group Diamond Rio.  It was released in June 1992 as the fifth and final single from their self-titled album.  It peaked at number 7 in the United States, and number 15 in Canada.

Critical reception
Deborah Evans Price, of Billboard magazine reviewed the song favorably, saying that a "hooky and exceptionally entertaining guitar teases vocals throughout this number." She goes on to say that the band's performance, "coupled with the guitar chase delivers a winner."

Music video
The music video was directed by Michael Merriman.

Chart performance

Year-end charts

References

1992 singles
Diamond Rio songs
Songs written by Monty Powell
Arista Nashville singles
1991 songs